Cosme Vázquez Subiabre (15 January 1904 - 27 August 1976), nicknamed "Ángel de Madrid" was a Spanish footballer who played as a center-forward. He played for the main Madrid teams at the time, Atlético Madrid and Real Madrid.

References

1904 births
1976 deaths
People from O Condado
Sportspeople from the Province of Pontevedra
Footballers from Galicia (Spain)
Spanish footballers
Association football forwards
Real Madrid CF players
Sporting de Gijón players
RC Celta de Vigo players
Atlético Madrid footballers
La Liga players
Spain international footballers